A bandolier is a pocketed belt for holding ammunition.

Bandolier may also refer to:

 Bandolier (album), a 1975 album by the hard rock group Budgie
 Bandolier (journal), an independent online electronic journal
 HMAS Bandolier (P 95), an Attack class patrol boat
 Minneapolis Bandolier, a bandy club

See also
Bandelier (disambiguation)